Carme  is a retrograde irregular satellite of Jupiter. It was discovered by Seth Barnes Nicholson at Mount Wilson Observatory in California in July 1938. It is named after the mythological Carme, mother by Zeus of Britomartis, a Cretan goddess.

History

It was sometimes called "Pan" between 1955 and 1975 (Pan is now the name of a satellite of Saturn).

It gives its name to the Carme group, made up of irregular retrograde moons orbiting Jupiter at a distance ranging between 23 and 24 Gm and at an inclination of about 165°. Its orbital elements are as of January 2000. They are continuously changing due to solar and planetary perturbations.

Properties
It is light red in color (B−V=0.76, V−R=0.47), similar to D-type asteroids and consistent with Taygete, but not Kalyke.

See also
Irregular satellites
Jupiter's moons in fiction

References

External links
Carme Profile by NASA's Solar System Exploration
David Jewitt pages
Jupiter's Known Satellites (by Scott S. Sheppard)

Carme group
Moons of Jupiter
Irregular satellites
19380730
Moons with a retrograde orbit